The Roman Catholic Diocese of Votuporanga is a suffragan diocese in the ecclesiastical province of the Metropolitan Archdiocese of Ribeirão Preto, in the northwest of São Paulo State, southern Brazil.

Its cathedral seat is the Catedral Nossa Senhora Aparecida, devoted to Our Lady of Aparecida, in Votuporanga, São Paulo State.

History 
Established on 2016.07.20 by Pope Francis as Diocese of Votuporanga, on Brazilian territories split off from the Diocese of Jales and the Diocese of São José do Rio Preto. It still borders both as well as the dioceses of Ituiutaba and Araçatuba. It instantly depended on the Roman Congregation for Bishops, without having had a missionary phase.

Ordinaries 
Its first and present Suffragan Bishop is Moacir Aparecido de Freitas (2016.07.20 – ...), born 1962.08.22 in Brazil, ordained priest 1987.12.11, consecrated bishop 2016.10.11.

External links and sources 
 GCatholic

Roman Catholic dioceses in Brazil
Roman Catholic Ecclesiastical Province of Ribeirão Preto